David's Sling, also formerly known as Magic Wand, is an Israel Defense Forces military system being jointly developed by the Israeli defense contractor Rafael Advanced Defense Systems and the American defense contractor Raytheon, designed to intercept enemy planes, drones, tactical ballistic missiles, medium- to long-range rockets and cruise missiles, fired at ranges from 40 km (24.85 miles) to 300 km (186.41 miles). David's Sling is meant to replace the MIM-23 Hawk and MIM-104 Patriot in the Israeli arsenal.

The system's Stunner missile is designed to intercept the newest generation of tactical ballistic missiles at low altitude, such as the Russian Iskander and the Chinese DF-15 using an on-board dual CCD/IR seekers to distinguish between decoys and the actual warhead of the missile, in addition to tracking by Elta EL/M-2084 Active electronically scanned array multi-mode radar. The multi-stage interceptor consists of a solid-fuel rocket motor booster, followed by an asymmetrical kill vehicle with advanced steering for super-maneuverability during the kill-stage. A three-pulse motor provides additional acceleration and maneuverability during the terminal phase. David's Sling became operational in April 2017.

David's Sling was meant to bolster the second tier of Israel's theater missile defense system. The name David's Sling comes from the biblical story of David and Goliath. It forms one level of Israel's future multi-tiered missile defense system, which also includes Arrow 2, Arrow 3, Iron Dome, and Iron Beam.

Development
The interceptor is a two-stage missile, with two targeting and guidance systems installed in its nose-tip (a radar and an electro-optical sensor). In order to enable Israel to make use of the financial aid provided by the United States to further develop the system and to produce it, a partnership was established with Raytheon which developed the missile firing unit and overall logistic system and assisted Rafael with developing the interceptor. In some of Raytheon's publications, the interceptor is referred to as "Stunner". In November 2012, David's Sling was expected to enter operational service in 2013 or 2014. David's Sling owes much to the SPYDER programme's modified Python 5 and DERBY seeker technology.

In addition to the David's Sling system, which is designed to intercept medium- and long-range rockets, the Iron Dome system, a separate system with which it will be used in conjunction, designed to intercept short-range rockets (4–70 km), and the Arrow missile, a separate system designed to intercept ballistic missiles, are already in use.

On 25 November 2012, Israel successfully tested the Stunner interceptor missile. The David's Sling battery, stationed at an undisclosed desert location in Southern Israel, fired and destroyed the incoming missile with a two-stage interceptor.

In late November 2014, the IDF revealed that the David's Sling system would soon be deployed in various areas around Israel for a trial period before becoming operational.  Initial trials will focus on its ability to intercept short and medium-range rockets and missiles with a range of coverage three times greater than Iron Dome.  After that, the system needs to undergo two further trials, testing its ability to intercept aircraft and longer-range missiles and then cruise missiles.  David's Sling will be linked up to the Home Front Command's command and control systems, as well as also having its own independent interception management center.

In February 2015, Israel asked the US Congress for $250M in additional assistance in producing David's Sling. US Companies that would be awarded contracts include Raytheon Co.; Arlington, Virginia-based Orbital ATK Inc.; and Falls Church, Virginia-based Northrop Grumman Corp. Other defense websites reported that Israel had requested US$150M in funding for the procurement phase, which will include two systems controlling multiple fire units, covering the entire area of Israel. Still other sources said development costs for David's Sling were capped to around $250M so far. The $150M request is for initial procurement of one or two batteries. Since two batteries can cover the whole territory of Israel it is clear that Israeli initial procurement will start with just two batteries.

David's Sling was planned to be deployed in 2015, but budget shortfalls for infrastructure for deployable missile batteries delayed its operational date to 2017.

On 21 December 2015, the David's Sling Weapon System (DSWS) demonstrated its ability to destroy salvos of heavy long-range rockets and short-range ballistic missiles, completing the first block of developmental tests.  With the testing regimen completed, the system is slated for delivery to the Israeli Air Force in the first quarter of 2016.  David's Sling will protect areas above the short-range Iron Dome and under the upper-atmospheric Arrow-2, particularly against threats like the Russian 9K720 Iskander tactical ballistic missiles, the Syrian Khaibar-1 302 mm rockets and the Iranian Fateh-110 used by Hezbollah, as well as the Scud-B.

On 2 April 2017, at a ceremony held at Hatzor Airbase attended by Israeli and United States dignitaries, two batteries of the David's Sling Weapon System were officially declared operational, activating the final component of the Israeli multi-tiered anti-missile defense array.

Work is underway on an air launched variant.

Operational history
On 23 July 2018, David's Sling was used for the first time in a combat situation. According to Israeli sources, Israeli authorities said they initially feared that two Syrian OTR-21 Tochka missiles were headed for Israel. Ultimately the two Syrian short-range ballistic missiles—fired as part of the country's internal fighting and not deliberately aimed at Israel—did not clear the border and landed one kilometer inside Syria. One of the interceptors was detonated over Israel. In November 2019, Chinese media reports claimed that the Russians captured the other missile, which was transferred to them by Syria. The missile was found intact by Syrian military forces, as it did not explode on contact after being fired in July 2018.

Foreign interest

On 17 November 2010, in an interview Rafael's Vice President Mr. Lova Drori confirmed that the David's Sling system has been offered to the Indian Armed Forces.

In October 2015, it became publicized that all six countries of the Gulf Cooperation Council (GCC) were interested in procuring the Israeli David's Sling missile defense system as a response to the Iranian missile threat.  This comes after U.S. urging for GCC members to more closely cooperate on missile defense through joint procurement and information sharing.  Any deal however would occur between Raytheon and other American companies, partly because of their involvement in the development of the system, and partly because of continuing local attitudes towards Israel.

In September 2018, the Swiss armaments procurement agency Armasuisse announced its interest to receive proposals regarding the David's Sling system for the renewal of Switzerland's air defence capacities.

On 5 March 2022, the Finnish Defence Forces announced that the final two contenders for a future high-altitude air-defence system will be Rafael's David's Sling and Israel Aerospace Industries' Barak-MX, with the final decision slated for early 2023.

SkyCeptor (PAAC-4)

In July 2013, Raytheon revealed it was working with international partners to develop a new air-defense missile system. The system is based on the AN/MPQ-53 radar from the MIM-104 Patriot, a Kongsberg/Raytheon Fire Direction Center, and the Rafael Stunner surface-to-air missile. According to Lt. Gen. Henry Obering, former director of the U.S. Missile Defense Agency, "We wanted a truly co-managed program because the United States will be very interested in this for our own purposes."

In August 2013, Raytheon and Rafael began to seek funding for a fourth-generation Patriot intercepting system, called the Patriot Advanced Affordable Capability-4 (PAAC-4). The system aims to integrate the Stunner interceptor from the jointly funded David's Sling program with Patriot PAC-3 radars, launchers, and engagement control stations. The two-stage, multimode seeking Stunner would replace single-stage, radar-guided PAC-3 missiles produced by Lockheed Martin. Government and industry sources claim the Stunner-based PAAC-4 interceptors will offer improved operational performance at 20 percent of the $2 million unit cost of the Lockheed-built PAC-3 missiles. The companies are seeking $20 million in U.S. government funding to demonstrate cost and performance claims through a prototype PAAC-4 system. Israeli program officials have said that a previous teaming agreement between Raytheon and Rafael would allow the U.S. company to assume prime contractor status, and produce at least 60 percent of the Stunner missile in the United States. The Missile Defense Agency has said that the U.S. Army is considering use of the Stunner as a potential solution to future U.S. military requirements.

In 2016 Raytheon announced that it had been authorised to bid SkyCeptor, a Stunner derivative, as part of its Patriot bid for the Polish government's medium-range air defence Wisła program. In March 2017 it was announced that the Raytheon bid had been successful, with Poland to acquire Patriot system in the first stage of the program. It was further announced that Poland would acquire only a small number of Patriot PAC-3 MSE missiles, with the majority of missiles deployed with the system being SkyCeptors. Ultimately, Poland did not acquire the SkyCeptor missiles in the second stage of the Wisła program in May 2022, replacing them with the construction of a new layer of short-range air defence under the separate Narew program, which will be integrated with Patriot batteries with an advanced IBCS battle command system. As part of the Narew program, Poland plans to acquire CAMM and CAMM-ER missiles. Polish government concluded an agreement with the British government opening the way for their production in the country which ends the discussion of possible acquisition of SkyCeptors.

Electromecanica Ploiesti, Romania, will launch a three-year investment program in 2023 to build SkyCeptor missile interceptors with U.S. Raytheon. The first missiles are expected in 2026.

References

External links

 Stunner // Terminal Missile Defense Interceptor Rafael
 Information About the David's Sling System From the Raytheon Website
 .
 New Air Defense System: David's Sling, Israel Defense Forces YouTube channel, 20 March 2017

21st-century surface-to-air missiles
Emergency management in Israel
Missile defense
Surface-to-air missiles of Israel
Weapons and ammunition introduced in 2017
Rafael Advanced Defense Systems